Infinithéâtre is an anglophone theatre in Montreal. Located in the Mile End area of Montreal, most of their productions play at Le Bain St-Michel, a converted bath house. It was founded in 1988 by Marianne Ackerman and Clare Schapiro as "Théâtre 1774", and its name was changed to Infinithéâtre in 1997, when Artistic Director Guy Sprung took over.  Known as an alternative English language theatre in Montreal, one-time referred to as the "risk theatre", they focus on developing and presenting new plays by Quebec writers. Under the belief that "Theatre is a collective experience that must be both an entertainment and a reflection of and on significant social and political issues". In this regard, they organize an annual playwriting contest entitled Write-On-Q. The prize is $5000 and an opportunity to have the play publicly read at Pipeline, Infinitheatre's reading series destined to allow the audience to contribute to the theatre's future programming.

Timeline

1995 Sliding In All Directions, a mosaic written by four separate playwrights and directed by Guy Sprung wins the Masque (the all-Québec Theatre Awards) for best English production of the year.

1997/98 To showcase the depth and quality of Montréal's small English theatre companies Infinithéâtre stages three festivals of new plays: November to Remember (1997), May To Play (1998), and the Infinite Festival (1998).

October 1999 Infinithéâtre transforms the immense, abandoned Darling Foundry in Old Montréal into a performance venue and presents a unique bilingual version of Samuel Beckett's Endgame/Fin de partie. Despite little heating and below zero temperatures, the production was a major critical and audience success and the run had to be extended.

2000 In co-production with the Francophone theatre company OMNIBUS, Michael Mackenzie's bilingual play Farce is mounted as an official Heritage Canada Millennium event at Espace Libre.

January 2001 Byron Ayanoglu's play Food/Bouffe, staged at the Lion d'Or, is a sold out featured event of the 2001 Montréal Highlights Festival.

September 2001Infinithéâtre is Québec and Canada's first representation at the Cairo International Festival of Experimental Theatre with its bilingual production of Beckett's Endgame/Fin de partie.

June/July 2002 Jacob Richmond's Small Returns and Trevor Ferguson's Long, Long, Short, Long are mounted at the Monument National. Mr. Ferguson's play is subsequently nominated as Best New Québec Text at the 2002 Soirée des Masques.

March 2003 With the American forces invading Iraq, a contemporary anti-war version of Richard III is produced by Manitoba Theatre Centre. The artistic concept for the production had its genesis in a series of workshops staged at Infinithéâtre. Nine of Infinithéâtre's actors and the American movie star William Hurt travel to Winnipeg for the show. The production is a mega commercial and artistic success.

October 2003 Guy Sprung's adaptation of George Bernard Shaw's Major Barbara is co-produced with the Saidye Bronfman Centre as part of the subscription season.

October 2004 After extraordinary critical acclaim and strong popular demand, Infinithéâtre is able to extend the run of Booker prize-winning novelist Yann Martel's The Facts Behind The Helsinki Roccamatios starring the award winning actor Joe Cobden. The production subsequently wins a triple crown of awards as best English theatre in Québec for the 2004-05 season.

March 2005 Infinithéâtre produces Guy Sprung's controversial play Death and Taxes at the Saidye Bronfman Centre and sells a (for Infinithéâtre) record-breaking number of single tickets. The production is nominated by the French Critics Association as best English production of the season.

September 2005 Carolyn Guillet's Seventeen [Anonymous] Women is premiered in the Bain St-Michel with gratifyingly wide attendance from a variety of women's groups.

September 2005 Le Pont, a translation of Trevor Ferguson's play Long, Long, Short, Long is produced successfully at the Place des Arts as part of the Compagnie Jean-Duceppe season. Directed by Guy Sprung, it is essentially the Infinithéâtre production of 2002 in French.

November 2006 The Pipeline, a developmental workshop and public reading series of the plays Infinithéâtre is looking at for future seasons, is inaugurated. Repeated in the fall of 2007, The Pipeline is now slated to be an annual event.

April 2007 Infinithéâtre's production of Yann Martel's The Facts Behind the Helsinki Roccamatios is the only English theatre production from Québec featured at the National Arts Centre's prestigious Québec Scene.

2007/08 Infinithéâtre's most ambitious season to date. Daniel Danis' That Woman, Jason Maghanoy's GAS and Trevor Ferguson's Zarathustra Said Some Things, No? are offered as a miniseries of plays. The theatre inaugurates a flexible Six-Pack ticket-purchasing concept. It also successfully begins Action Infini an educational initiative targeting groups of CEGEP and University students. Over 1,000 students see our production of GAS.

May 2008 Infinithéâtre's production of Helsinki Roccamatios... plays at the Factory Theatre in Toronto.

Funding

Infinitheatre is supported by foundations, sponsors and individuals. They are also awarded the occasional grant from the government.

References

External links

Theatre companies in Quebec
Theatre in Montreal
Canadian dramatist and playwright awards